The District Council of Stirling was a local government area of South Australia from 1883 to 1997, seated at Stirling.

History
The council was established in 1883 from a western portion of the District Council of Echunga and an eastern portion of the District Council of Mitcham.

Stirling council annexed a northerly-adjacent portion of the District Council of Crafers when it was abolished in 1935, enlarging the council area in a region of high population growth.

In 1997 Stirling amalgamated with the district councils of Onkaparinga and East Torrens to its north, and the District Council of Gumeracha, to form the much larger Adelaide Hills Council.

References

Stirling, District Council of
1883 establishments in Australia
1997 disestablishments in Australia